Graham Monkhouse (born 26 April 1954) is a former English cricketer.  Monkhouse was a right-handed batsman who bowled right-arm medium pace.  He was born at Langwathby, near Penrith, Cumberland.

References

External links
Graham Monkhouse at ESPNcricinfo
Graham Monkhouse at CricketArchive

1954 births
Living people
People from Penrith, Cumbria
English cricketers
Cumberland cricketers
Surrey cricketers
Cricketers from Cumbria